Volko Audio is a music technology company located in Turkey, Istanbul that produces virtual instruments and audio effects. It is the first company to produce virtual instruments in Turkey and Volko Baglama is the first professional virtual Turkish instrument in the world.

History
The company was founded in August 2004 by Volkan Özyılmaz. Its first name was Volko and the first product was Volko Baglama which was released in 2005. Volko Baglama is the first virtual professional baglama instrument. In July 2009 the firm started the second project, the  Volko Alaturka Drum. Company changed its name to be Volko Audio in May 2010. The Volko Alaturka Drum was released in January 2011.

First Baglama and Turkish-Made Virtual Instrument
Kvr Audio is a reliable site which contains most of the audio firms, released virtual instruments and audio effects in the world. According to Kvr Audio, Volko Baglama was released on 31 May 2005 and there was no baglama instrument released earlier than the Volko Baglama.

In 2005 July, the Turkish music technology magazine "Volume" reviewed Volko Baglama and mentioned about it being the first virtual instrument in Turkey. It was reviewed by Orhan Erol and Cem Sarıoğlu. The review highlights:

"Completely local made, first VST plug-in" (in the cover of magazine) 
"Finally we have a VST" (in the cover of the article) 
"Observing the lack of such a VST and knowing the interest of foreign musicians to Turkish local instruments, Volkan Özyılmaz is proud to make this doubtful journey real after receiving good feedback from international audience."

Cover of MagazineFirst Page of Review Second Page of Review

First Middle Eastern Drummer as a Virtual Instrument
Volko Alaturka Drum is the first virtual instrument drummer which can play middle eastern rhythms automatically. It was announced at 13 January 2011 Kvr Audio News Item.

It was reviewed by Paolo Tonelli on Audio Video Music Magazine in Italy. Review The review highlights:

"A plug-in which was created recently from a country of great cultural and historical importance, famous with its natural beauties and which is a bridge between east and west."
"A complete plug-in equipped with various styles, colors, imagination and music taste which is able to introduce us many new ideas."
"Plug-in which is dedicated to the traditional rhythms of middle east."

In 2013 May, audiofanzine website reviewed Volko Alaturka Drum in The Best Virtual Drums list. Here is the words:

"Volko Alaturka Drum is quite special: it allows you to incorporate rhythms from the Middle East and North Africa into your songs, but with a somewhat "western" sound. Specially noteworthy are the two Gretsch kits (900 MB of samples with 10 velocity layers per sample), as well as the drag 'n' drop ability for sequencers, the humanizing functions and the processing (reverb, limiter). And let's not forget that it is compatible with VST, AU and RTAS under Windows and OS X. Price: $119."

References
1. Kvr Audio Link for Volko Baglama
2. Kvr Audio News Item for Volko Baglama at 31 May 2005
3. Volume Magazine July 2005 Cover (Turkish)
4. Volume Magazine July 2005 Page 48 First Page of Review (Turkish)
5. Volume Magazine July 2005 Page 49 Second Page of Review (Turkish)
6. Kvr Audio Link for Volko Alaturka Drum
7. Kvr Audio News Item for Volko Alaturka Drum at 13 January 2011
8. Review of Volko Alaturka Drum by PaoloTonelli (Italian) (English translation) (Turkish translation)
9. Audio Video Music Vol34 Audio Video Music Vol34 Audio Video Music Vol34 (Italian)
10. The Best Virtual Drums list by audiofanzine

External links
 Volko Alaturka Drum
 Volko Baglama

Music equipment manufacturers
Companies based in Istanbul